Associação Desportiva Jequié, known as Jequié, are a Brazilian football team from Jequié, Bahia. The club competes in the Campeonato Baiano, after winning the second division in 2017.

History
Founded on 20 November 1969, Jequié featured regularly in the Campeonato Baiano first division during the 70s, being relegated in 1980. After a period of inactivity, the club returned in 1991 and was crowned champions of the second level in the following year.

After an impressive third position in 1994, Jequié was relegated as dead last in 1997. After spending the 200s floating between the second and first levels and also through inactivity, the team was again crowned champions of the second division in 2017.

Honours
Campeonato Baiano Second Division: 1992, 2017

External links
 
Ogol team profile 

Association football clubs established in 1969
Football clubs in Bahia
1969 establishments in Brazil